Mable Hillery (July 22, 1929 – April 27, 1976) was an American singer who was a member of the Georgia Sea Island Singers as well as a solo recording artist.

Biography
Hillery was born in LaGrange, Georgia. She married Will Adams in 1950, and moved to the Georgia Sea Islands around 1960. She joined The Georgia Sea Island Singers in 1961.
	
She had six children, and outside of performing with The Georgia Sea Island Singers was known for her work in the public school systems of both New York City and Atlanta, Georgia. She was active in the civil rights movement in the sixties. Her obituary appeared in the New York Times on May 1, 1976.

Partial discography

 Get in Union: Recordings by Alan Lomax 1959-1966 (Tompkins Square, 2015)
 It's So Hard To Be A Nigger  (XTRA, 1968)
 Hotter Than a Bulldog Spitting In a Polecat's Eye - Live 1975 (with Johnny Shines, Americana Music Productions)

References

External links
  Illustrated discography

1929 births
1976 deaths
American folk singers
People from LaGrange, Georgia